Dragon Ball Z: Cooler's Revenge, also known by its Japanese title , or by Toei's own English title Dragon Ball Z: The Strongest Rivals, is a 1991 Japanese anime science fiction martial arts film and the fifth Dragon Ball Z animated feature film, originally released in Japan on July 20 at the Toei Anime Fair.

Plot

Cooler watches as his younger brother Frieza destroys the Saiyan home world. His henchmen prepare to destroy a space pod fleeing the doomed planet that is transporting a Saiyan infant to Earth; but Cooler allows it to go, accounting that it is Frieza's responsibility. More than twenty years later, this Saiyan, Goku, defeats Frieza. After learning of his brother's death, Cooler takes his men – Salza, Neiz, and Dore, on a mission to reclaim his family's honor. On Earth, Cooler's forces ambush Goku and his friends while they are on a camping trip. Goku is badly wounded when he protects Gohan from an energy blast launched by Cooler.

Krillin and Oolong find shelter in a cave with Goku, while Gohan travels to obtain the magic Senzu beans that can heal his father. Cooler orders his men to completely obliterate the forest, believing Goku is in hiding. After obtaining the beans, Gohan is ambushed by Cooler's men before Piccolo arrives to save him. Piccolo kills 'Dore and Neiz, but Cooler arrives and impales him with an energy beam. Salza manages to track Gohan to the cave and destroys the beans. However, Gohan successfully heals Goku with a spare one. Krillin and Gohan are quickly defeated by Salza but Goku soon emerges. Cooler taunts Goku by further injuring Piccolo. Goku incapacitates Salza and attacks Cooler.

After Goku proves to be a worthy opponent, Cooler reveals that he discovered a new transformation above Frieza's capabilities. Goku is pummeled by Cooler, who boasts and mocks him. However, after seeing a bird die from wounds inflicted by their fight, Goku reflects on the well-being of his loved ones. Goku retrieves the deceased bird and transforms into his Super Saiyan form, using his energy to revive it.

Cooler finds himself grossly outclassed by Super Saiyan Goku. Cooler powers up an enormous energy sphere and launches the attack with the hopes to destroy Goku and the Earth along with him. Goku manages to resist and overpower the attack; he sends it hurdling toward Cooler who is launched into space and collides with the sun. As he is incinerated, Cooler realizes that Goku was the Saiyan infant he spared decades ago. As he laments over his mistake, he is disintegrated.

Goku, drained after his victory, is found by his loved ones. They celebrate and search for Piccolo when Salza reappears and prepares to kill them. However, Salza is unexpectedly killed by Piccolo. Gohan yells out for Piccolo who is nowhere to be seen. Piccolo, having recovered, drinks some water and gazes skyward.

Cast

Music
OP (Opening Theme):
"Cha-La Head-Cha-La"
 Lyrics by Yukinojō Mori
 Music by Chiho Kiyooka
 Arranged by Kenji Yamamoto
 Performed by Hironobu Kageyama
ED (Ending Theme):
 
 Lyrics by Dai Satō
 Music by Chiho Kiyooka
 Arranged by Kenji Yamamoto
 Performed by Hironobu Kageyama and Ammy

English dub soundtrack
The following songs were present in the Funimation dub of Cooler's Revenge.
 Drowning Pool - Reminded
 Dust for Life - Poison
 American Pearl - Seven Years
 Breaking Point - Under
 Finger Eleven - Stay and Drown
 Breaking Point - Falling Down
 Drowning Pool - Mute
 Disturbed - The Game
 Drowning Pool - Told You So
 Deftones - Change (In the House of Flies)
 American Pearl - Revelation
 Breaking Point - Phoenix

The Double Feature release contains an alternate audio track containing the English dub with original Japanese background music by Shunsuke Kikuchi and an ending theme of "The Incredible Mightiest vs. Mightiest".

The dub made in the Philippines contained English versions of the Japanese opening and ending theme songs.

Releases
It was released on DVD and VHS in North America on January 22, 2002. It was later released in Double Feature set along with The Return of Cooler (1992) for Blu-ray and DVD on November 11, 2008, both feature full 1080p format in HD remastered 16:9 aspect ratio and an enhanced 5.1 surround mix. The film was re-released to DVD in remastered thinpak collection on November 1, 2011, containing the first 5 Dragon Ball Z films.

Reception

Other companies
A fourth English version released exclusively in Malaysia by Speedy Video features an unknown voice cast. Creative Products Corporation made an English dub for the Philippines with the title Dragon Ball Z: The Greatest Rivals.

References

External links
 Official anime website of Toei Animation
 
 

1991 films
1991 anime films
Cooler's Revenge
Funimation
Toei Animation films
Films scored by Shunsuke Kikuchi
Toonami
Anime and manga about revenge